Llanfihangel Ystrad (English "Vale of St Michael") is a constituent community in Ceredigion, Wales. It is named after the principal place of worship, St Michael's church at Ystrad Aeron.

The total population of the community taken at the United Kingdom Census 2011 was 1,430.

Villages within the community include Ystrad Aeron, Dihewyd, Cribyn and Temple Bar.

Governance
An electoral ward of the same name exists. This ward stretches to the community of Nantcwnlle with a total population of 2,037.

Notable people 
 Daniel Evans (1792–1846), a Welsh language poet; born at Maesymynach, a local farm.

References

Villages in Ceredigion